Anna Christine Wilson (born July 12, 1997) is an American former college basketball player for the Stanford Cardinal of the Pac-12 Conference. A guard, Wilson holds the team record for most games played over a career with 160, the fourth-most in the history of the National Collegiate Athletic Association (NCAA). At the 2014 FIBA Under-17 World Championship for Women, Wilson won a gold medal as a part of Team USA. Wilson played three seasons of high school basketball for Collegiate School, where she set the team record for career assists with 246 and had the fifth-most points in team history with 735. Moving to play as a senior for the Bellevue High School Wolverines, Wilson and the team finished the year with an undefeated season and won the 2016 Class 3A girls state championship. She was named to the McDonald's All-American Game, an all-star girls' basketball game composed of many top-ranked American and Canadian high school basketball graduating seniors.

At Stanford, Wilson played primarily a bench role until her fifth-year senior season. As a fifth-year senior, she started every game, was named the Pac-12 Co-Defensive Player of the Year and made the Pac-12 All-Defensive Team, and won the 2021 NCAA Division I national championship with the Cardinal. She finished her career with Stanford in 2022 after six seasons, and again made the Pac-12 All-Defensive Team. After college, Wilson declared for the 2022 WNBA draft, where she went unselected. Her brother Russell is a quarterback for the Denver Broncos in the National Football League who won Super Bowl XLVIII with the Seattle Seahawks.

Early life and high school career
Anna Christine Wilson was born on July 12, 1997 in Richmond, Virginia, to Tammy and Harrison Wilson III, her mother a nurse and her father a lawyer. Her father played American football and baseball at Dartmouth College. Anna's grandmother was a college professor and her uncle graduated from Harvard Law School. By age five, Anna began playing basketball, and, as she got older, her father coached her at a local YMCA before he died when she was 12.

Wilson participated in the United States Under-16 national team trials in 2013. She won a gold medal at the 2014 FIBA Under-17 World Championship for Women as the United States defeated Spain in the final, 77–75; Wilson played 3:05 minutes and missed her only field goal attempted. She attended Collegiate School in Richmond, Virginia before she moved to Bellevue, Washington for her senior year. At Collegiate, she modeled how she played after Steve Nash. After three seasons, she held Collegiate's career assists record with 246 and had the fifth-most points in team history with 735. For the Bellevue High School Wolverines, Wilson was voted a captain of the team by her teammates. She played as a point guard, and averaged 15.3 points per game, 3.2 steals per game, and 4.6 assists per game as Bellevue finished with an undefeated record and won a Class 3A girls state championship. 

ESPN HoopGurlz ranked Wilson as a five-star prospect and the 42nd-best player in the United States while recruiting website Prospects Nation ranked Wilson as the 34th-best player and as a four-star prospect. She graduated high school in 2016. Wilson was selected for the McDonald's All-American Game, an all-star girls' basketball game which comprised many of the top-ranked American and Canadian high school basketball graduating seniors and was played the same day as a counterpart boys' game. Before the match, Wilson suffered a concussion in practice, which was her third; consequently, Wilson did not play in the game. As a high school sophomore, she verbally committed to attend and play for Stanford University, and had offers from Wake Forest, Maryland, Marquette, Wisconsin, and Virginia.

College career

Wilson only played in six games during her freshman year with the Stanford Cardinal due to health issues: she missed the first eleven games as she recovered from her concussion, and missed the final eleven games of the season with a right foot injury. She made her Stanford debut against the Yale Bulldogs, where she scored eleven points over seventeen minutes played in a 102–44 Stanford victory. She finished her freshman year with seventeen points over forty-eight minutes played. Wilson made her first career start against the UNLV Lady Rebels during her sophomore year and scored eight points. She scored a career-high twenty-one points against the Ohio State Buckeyes in a game Stanford lost 94–82. She finished the year with an average of 3.3 points per game over 10.7 minutes per game and two games started, though she missed the last seven games of the season because of a left foot injury.

In her junior year, Wilson averaged 2.7 points per game over thirty-two games played and three games started as Stanford won the 2019 Pac-12 Conference women's basketball tournament but lost in the Elite Eight round of the 2019 NCAA Division I women's basketball tournament to the Notre Dame Fighting Irish 84–68. As a senior, she averaged 2.5 points per game in a bench role as Stanford lost in the final of the 2020 Pac-12 Conference tournament to the Oregon Ducks, and the NCAA tournament was cancelled due to the COVID-19 pandemic. Because of the health issues her freshman year, Wilson was granted another season of eligibility at Stanford under the NCAA's hardship wavier rule after an appeal of an initial denial.

As a fifth-year senior, Wilson started every game, and was noted for her defensive ability. She finished with career highs in minutes per game, at 23.6, field goal percentage, at .509, and rebounds per game, with 3.7. The Cardinal defeated the Arizona Wildcats 54–53 to win the 2021 NCAA Division I Women's Basketball Championship Game; Wilson, who started the game, played thirty-one minutes, accumulating five points, three assists and four rebounds. In March, Wilson was named Pac-12 Co-Defensive Player of the Year, along with Aari McDonald of Arizona. She was eligible to play a sixth season due to the COVID-19 pandemic, which shortened the 2020–2021 season, and, on May 10, she announced she would return for a sixth season at Stanford. 

In her sixth season with the Cardinal, Wilson played in thirty-five games, with twenty-five starts and a new career-high 25.7 minutes per game. She played point guard along with Lacie Hull after the graduation of Kiana Williams. Facing the Washington Huskies, Wilson scored the go-ahead layup after stealing an inbound pass in a 63–56 Stanford win on February 26. She made the Pac-12 All-Defensive team for a second time and finished the season with 4.7 points and 2.9 rebounds per game as Stanford lost in the Final Four of the 2022 NCAA Division I women's basketball tournament to the UConn Huskies 63–58. She finished her college career with 160 games played, fourth-most in NCAA history and most in Stanford history . Wilson declared for the 2022 WNBA draft, in which teams in the Women's National Basketball Association (WNBA) select players to sign for their rosters, where she went unchosen.

Career statistics

College
Source:

|-
| style="text-align:left;"| 2016–17
| style="text-align:left;"| Stanford
| 6 || 0 || 8.0 || .462 || .500 || .333 || 1.0 || 0.8 || 0.5 || 0.0 || 1.2 || 2.8
|-
| style="text-align:left;"| 2017–18
| style="text-align:left;"| Stanford
| 21 || 2 || 10.7 || .296 || .290 || .500 || 1.1 || 0.4 || 0.5 || 0.0 || 0.6 || 3.3
|-
| style="text-align:left;"| 2018–19
| style="text-align:left;"| Stanford
| 32 || 3 || 11.6 || .403 || .259 || .643 || 1.5 || 0.7 || 0.7 || 0.0 || 0.4 || 2.7
|-
| style="text-align:left;"| 2019–20
| style="text-align:left;"| Stanford
| 33 || 0 || 14.0 || .355 || .293 || .680 || 2.4 || 1.3 || 0.5 || 0.0 || 0.8 || 2.5
|-
| style="text-align:left;"| 2020–21
| style="text-align:left;"| Stanford
| 33 || 33 || 23.6 || .509 || .452 || .739 || 3.7 || 2.1 || 1.5 || 0.1 || 0.7 || 4.6
|-
| style="text-align:left;"| 2021–22
| style="text-align:left;"| Stanford
| 35 || 25 || 25.7 || .404 || .270 || .652 || 2.9 || 2.4 || 1.4 || 0.3 || 1.0 || 4.7

Personal life
Wilson is the sister of Denver Broncos quarterback Russell Wilson. In addition to Russell, Anna has another brother, Harrison Wilson IV, who played college football and college baseball for the University of Richmond. She was an art practice major at Stanford for her undergraduate degree, and a media studies/communication major for her master's degree.

Notes

References

External links
 Interview with Anna Wilson
  USA Basketball article on Wilson

1997 births
Living people
American women's basketball players
Basketball players from Richmond, Virginia
Guards (basketball)
McDonald's High School All-Americans
Stanford Cardinal women's basketball players